Events in the year 1933 in Spain.

Incumbents
President: Niceto Alcalá-Zamora 
President of the Council of Ministers: 
 until 12 September: Manuel Azaña
 12 September-9 October: Alejandro Lerroux
 9 October-16 December: Diego Martínez Barrio
 starting 16 December: Alejandro Lerroux

Events 

 January 11 - Casas Viejas incident
 November 5 - 1933 Basque Statute of Autonomy referendum

Births
March 3 - Alfredo Landa, actor (d. 2013)
March 16 - Teresa Berganza, opera singer (d. 2022)
April 16 - Marcos Alonso Imaz, footballer (d. 2012)
July 6 - Antonio Díaz-Miguel, basketball player and coach (d. 2000)
October 21 - Francisco Gento, footballer (d. 2022)

Deaths

Date unknown
Rafael Montoro, politician, lawyer, historian, writer and literary critic (b. 1852)

See also
List of Spanish films of the 1930s

References

 
Years of the 20th century in Spain
1930s in Spain
Spain
Spain